Paltsevo is a rural locality on Karelian Isthmus, in Vyborgsky District of Leningrad Oblast, where the battle of Tali-Ihantala took place in 1944, and a station of the Vyborg-Joensuu railroad.

Rural localities in Leningrad Oblast
Karelian Isthmus